Craig D. Ball is a computer forensic analyst and former trial lawyer who advises judges and lawyers on the use of electronic evidence.  He is also an adjunct professor at the University of Texas at Austin School of Law, and is the author of  the column Ball in Your Court column of the Law Technology News .  He has served as a special master in U.S. court cases involving electronic evidence, and been featured in The New York Times.

References

American lawyers
Living people
Year of birth missing (living people)